Exportation is a valid rule of replacement in propositional logic. The rule allows conditional statements having conjunctive antecedents to be replaced by statements having conditional consequents and vice versa in logical proofs. It is the rule that:

Where "" is a metalogical symbol representing "can be replaced in a proof with."

Formal notation 
The exportation rule may be written in sequent notation:

or in rule form:
, 

where the rule is that wherever an instance of "" appears on a line of a proof, it can be replaced with "" and vice versa;

or as the statement of a truth-functional tautology or theorem of propositional logic:

Natural language

Truth values 
At any time, if P→Q is true, it can be replaced by P→(P∧Q). 
One possible case for P→Q is for P to be true and Q to be true; thus P∧Q is also true, and P→(P∧Q) is true.  
Another possible case sets P as false and Q as true. Thus, P∧Q is false and P→(P∧Q) is false; false→false is true. 
The last case occurs when both P and Q are false. Thus, P∧Q is false and P→(P∧Q) is true.

Example 
It rains and the sun shines implies that there is a rainbow. 
Thus, if it rains, then the sun shines implies that there is a rainbow.

If my car is on, when I switch the gear to D the car starts going.
If my car is on and I have switched the gear to D, then the car must start going.

Proof  
The following proof uses material implication, double negation, De Morgan's laws, the negation of the conditional statement, the associative property of conjunction, the negation of another conditional statement, and double negation again, in that order to derive the result.

Relation to functions
Exportation is associated with currying via the Curry–Howard correspondence.

References

Rules of inference
Theorems in propositional logic